Sadr Madrasa is one of the largest madrasas in Isfahan, Iran. It was built by Mohammad Hosseyn Khan Sadr Esfahani, the famous governor of Isfahan in the era of Fath-Ali Shah Qajar. Although the structure and decorations of its facade is incomplete, but it has a very serene and pleasant environment because of its very old trees. Its outer facade has one of the best brickworks in Isfahan. Photography is prohibited in the school.

References 

Architecture in Iran
Schools in Isfahan